On April 22, 1994, Richard Milhous Nixon, the 37th president of the United States, died after suffering a stroke four days earlier, at the age of 81.

His state funeral followed five days later at the Richard Nixon Presidential Library and Museum in his hometown of Yorba Linda, California. He was the first former president to die in 21 years since Lyndon B. Johnson in 1973, while Nixon was president.

Nixon's wife, Pat, died on June 22, 1993. Just under ten months later, on April 18, 1994, Nixon had a cerebrovascular accident at his home in Park Ridge, New Jersey, and was taken to New York Hospital–Cornell Medical Center. After an initial favorable prognosis, Nixon slipped into a deep coma and died four days later at the age of 81. His body was flown to Marine Corps Air Station El Toro, Orange County, California, via SAM 27000, the presidential plane used as Air Force One while Nixon was in office. His body was transported to the Nixon Library and laid in repose. A public memorial service was held on April 27, attended by world dignitaries from 85 countries and all five living presidents of the United States, the first time that five U.S. presidents attended the funeral of another president.

Nixon's state funeral is unique among recent presidential state funerals in that, in accordance with his own wishes, none of the elements of the state ceremonies occurred in the nation's capital.

Death and tributes
Nixon suffered a significant stroke at his Park Ridge, New Jersey home, while preparing to eat dinner on Monday, April 18, 1994, at 5:45 p.m. EDT. An ambulance was called and he was taken to New York Hospital–Cornell Medical Center. He was conscious but unable to speak, and his vision was impaired. It was determined that a blood clot resulting from his heart condition had formed in his left atrium (upper heart), then broke off and traveled to his brain. His condition was determined to be stable the following day, as he was alert but unable to speak or move his right arm and leg. Nixon's prognosis was hopeful, and he was moved from the intensive care unit into a private room. His condition worsened that Tuesday night, however, complicated by symptoms of cerebral edema, or swelling of the brain. Nixon's living will stipulated that he was not to be placed on a ventilator to sustain his life. On Thursday, April 21, Nixon quickly sank into a deep coma. The following night, he died at 9:08 p.m., April 22, 1994. He was 81 years old. His daughters, Tricia and Julie, were by his side. The Vander Plaat Funeral Home in Wyckoff, New Jersey handled the funeral arrangements for President Nixon, just as they did for his late wife.

U.S. President Bill Clinton announced Nixon's death in the White House Rose Garden and proclaimed a national day of mourning five days later. Clinton stated that Nixon was "a statesman who sought to build a lasting structure of peace" and praised his "desire to give something back to this world." Clinton said that he was "deeply grateful to President Nixon for his wise counsel." Tributes also came from former Presidents Gerald Ford, Jimmy Carter, Ronald Reagan and George H. W. Bush. Former Secretary of State Henry Kissinger, former Senator George McGovern (who ran against Nixon in 1972), former Senator Howard Baker, Senator Bob Dole, Senator John McCain and Senator Ted Kennedy also reflected on Nixon's death.

Events in California

Transportation to the Nixon Library
Following the news of Nixon's death, tributes were placed at the Richard Nixon Presidential Library in Yorba Linda, California, the site of his birthplace. On April 26, the casket was placed into VC-137C SAM 27000, a member of the presidential fleet used as Air Force One while Nixon was in office, and flown to Marine Corps Air Station El Toro, Orange County, California. The body was transported in a motorcade, by hearse, to the Nixon Library.

Lying in repose

Carried by eight military pallbearers representing all branches of the United States military, Nixon's body was placed in the library lobby and lay in repose from the afternoon of Tuesday, April 26 to the afternoon of Wednesday, April 27. Despite severe rain, police estimated that roughly 50,000 people waited in lines up to 18 hours to walk past the casket and pay their respects.

Funeral service
The funeral service was held on Wednesday, April 27, on the grounds of the Nixon Library. The service was attended by over 4,000 people, including family members, President Bill Clinton and his wife Hillary, former Presidents and First Ladies George and Barbara Bush, Ronald and Nancy Reagan, Jimmy and Rosalynn Carter, and Gerald and Betty Ford. Former Vice President Spiro Agnew also attended. Former First Ladies Jacqueline Kennedy Onassis and Lady Bird Johnson both did not attend due to illness (Onassis died three weeks later from non-Hodgkin lymphoma). A congressional delegation consisting of over one hundred members was present, and a foreign diplomatic corps of over two hundred. Other members of Nixon's administration who attended included Elliot Richardson, James R. Schlesinger, William P. Rogers, James Thomas Lynn, George W. Romney, Alexander Haig, Herbert Stein, and Daniel Patrick Moynihan. Other guests included Nixon's opponent in the 1972 election George McGovern, Charles Colson, who served time in prison due to his part in the Watergate Scandal, Robert Abplanalp, Bebe Rebozo, and California State Assembly Speaker Willie Brown.

International guests included 
: Secretary General of the United Nations Boutros Boutros-Ghali
: Vice Premier of the People's Republic of China Zou Jiahua 
: Deputy Prime Minister of Russia Alexander Shokhin
: Minister of Foreign Affairs of Canada Lloyd Axworthy
: former Prime Minister of the United Kingdom Edward Heath
: former Prime Minister of Japan Toshiki Kaifu
: former President of Israel Chaim Herzog

The service was officiated by the Reverend Billy Graham, a friend of Richard Nixon's, who called him "one of the most misunderstood men, and I think he was one of the greatest men of the century." Eulogies were delivered by Graham, Henry Kissinger, Senator Bob Dole, California Governor Pete Wilson and President Clinton. Dole could not hold back his tears at the end of his speech.

Following the service, Nixon was buried beside his wife; Pat had died on June 22, 1993. They are buried only steps away from Richard Nixon's birthplace and boyhood home.

His funeral also marked the last major public appearance of former President Ronald Reagan, whose Alzheimer's disease was announced in November later that year. Reagan would become the next former president to die, ten years later, on June 5, 2004.

References

Further reading

Richard Nixon
Nixon, Richard Milhous
Nixon, Richard Milhous
Nixon, Richard Milhous
1994 in the United States
Nixon, Richard Milhous
Nixon, Richard Milhous
April 1994 events in the United States